Frank Jean Seator (24 October 1975 – 12 February 2013) was a Liberian striker who spent most of his football career in Asia. He died on 12 February 2013 at the Firestone Medical Hospital in Harbel, Liberia.

Club career
Seator played with Espérance in Tunisia, as well as clubs in Qatar, Kuwait, Saudi Arabia, Hungary and Sweden. In 2005, Seator played with Perak FA in Malaysia, and became a popular player with the fans (whom nicknamed him "Booker T", after the WWE wrestler). He scored 64 goals in all competition within only two and a half seasons. He also played for Indonesian side Persis Solo.

International career
Seator was a long-time member of the Liberia national football team. He was a member of the 2002 African Cup of Nations Liberia squad. He was also part of the Liberian squad qualifying for the 2008 African Cup of Nations.

References

External links
 Seator signs for Esperance BBC Sport, 30 November 2002
 Frank Seator Dispels Rumors of Expulsion LiberianSoccer.com, 12 November 2002

1975 births
2013 deaths
Liberian footballers
Liberian expatriate footballers
Association football forwards
Al-Khor SC players
Espérance Sportive de Tunis players
Al-Gharafa SC players
Al-Wakrah SC players
Fehérvár FC players
Degerfors IF players
Perak F.C. players
Selangor FA players
Liberian expatriate sportspeople in Malaysia
Expatriate footballers in Malaysia
Expatriate footballers in Indonesia
Expatriate footballers in Kuwait
Expatriate footballers in Qatar
Expatriate footballers in Tunisia
Expatriate footballers in Hungary
Expatriate footballers in Sweden
2002 African Cup of Nations players
Qatar Stars League players
Liberia international footballers
Al-Arabi SC (Kuwait) players
Kuwait Premier League players
Liberian expatriate sportspeople in Kuwait
Al-Rayyan SC players
Liberian expatriate sportspeople in Qatar
Liberian expatriate sportspeople in Oman
Liberian expatriate sportspeople in Indonesia
Liberian expatriate sportspeople in Sweden
Liberian expatriate sportspeople in Hungary
Liberian expatriate sportspeople in Tunisia
Sriwijaya F.C. players